This is a list of trees naturalized in West Virginia.

 Norway maple (Acer platanoides)
 Sycamore maple (Acer pseudoplatanus)
 Horse-chestnut (Aesculus hippocastanum)
 Tree of heaven (Ailanthus altissima)
 Northern catalpa (Catalpa speciosa)
 European larch (Larix decidua)
 Siberian larch (Larix sibirica)
 Osage orange (Maclura pomifera)
 White mulberry (Morus alba)
 Empress tree (Paulownia tomentosa)
 Norway spruce (Picea abies)
 Blue spruce (Picea pungens)
 Mountain pine (Pinus mugo)
 Black pine (Pinus nigra)
 Scots pine (Pinus sylvestris)
 Chinese elm (Ulmus parvifolia)

References 

Naturalized trees